GNU Fortran (GFortran) is an implementation of the Fortran programming language in the GNU Compiler Collection (GCC), an open-source and free software project maintained in the open-source programmer community under the umbrella of the GNU Project. It is the successor to previous compiler versions in the suite, such as g77.

History
As of July 2020, GFortran had almost fully implemented Fortran 2008, and about 20% of Fortran 2018. It supports the OpenMP multi-platform shared memory multiprocessing, up to its latest version (4.5). GFortran is also compatible with most language extensions and compilation options supported by g77, and many other popular extensions of the Fortran language.

Since GCC version 4.0.0, released in April 2005, GFortran has replaced the older g77 compiler. The new Fortran front-end for GCC was rewritten from scratch, after the principal author and maintainer of g77, Craig Burley, decided in 2001 to stop working on the g77 front end. GFortran forked off from g95 in January 2003, which itself started in early 2000. The two codebases have "significantly diverged" according to GCC developers, and g95 is not maintained anymore since 2013. Since 2010 the front-end, like the rest of the GCC project, has been migrated to C++, where it was previously written in C. Development of the compiler by volunteer users continues and each new version of GCC incorporates better support for the latest language standards and bug fixes.

See also

 Cray pointer
 Quadruple precision scientific notation

References

External links
 
 GFortran on the GCC Wiki
 The GFortran page of the Fortran Wiki.
 OpenMP in gfortran information web page 

Fortran compilers
Free compilers and interpreters
Fortran